Peter Grace may refer to:
 Peter Grace (Medal of Honor), American soldier and Medal of Honor recipient
 Peter Grace (sound engineer), Australian production sound mixer
 J. Peter Grace, American industrialist